The Chattushringi Temple also spelt as Chattushrungi Temple is a Hindu temple in the city of Pune in Maharashtra state of India. The temple is located on the slope of a hill on Senapati Bapat Road. It is said to have been built during the reign of the Maratha kingShivaji. The temple is looked after by Chattushringi Devasthan (Temple) trustees.

Chattushringi (Chattu means four) is a mountain with four peaks. One has to climb more than 170 steps to reach the shrine of Goddess Chattushringi. In the temple premises there are also temples of Goddess Durga and Lord Ganesh. This includes eight miniature idols of Ashtavinayaka. These small temples are located on the four separate hillocks.

Legend

The legend associated with the temple is that, once there was a rich and prosperous merchant named Durlabhsheth Pitambardas Mahajan who was an ardent believer of Goddess Saptashrungi Devi and visited Vani every now and then. But as he grew older, he could no longer travel and this hindered him from visiting the temple and it bought him sorrow in his heart, he prayed Saptashrungi Devi with tears and then one night the Goddess Saptashrungi Devi appeared in his dream and told him, "if you can not come to me, I will come to you & stay near you." She told him to come to a mountain situated in the North-West of Pune & dig there. The place as described by the goddess was traced out and a miracle happened as he found a natural statue of the goddess (swayambhu devi). He constructed the temple at that place and this is the same temple which was renovated from time to time, which is the present temple.

Deity

The presiding deity of the temple is Goddess Chattushringi, also known as Goddess Ambareshwari. She is also considered as the presiding deity of the city of Pune. The temple is maintained by the Chattushringi Devasthan Trust. Every year a fair is held at the foothills on the eve of Navratri. Thousands of people gather to worship the Goddess Chattushringi.

See also
List of Hindu temples in India

References

External links
Chattushringi Devasthan, Pune

Hindu temples in Pune
Shakti temples
Monuments and memorials to Shivaji